The 2011 Western Michigan Broncos football team represented Western Michigan University West Division of the Mid-American Conference  during the 2011 NCAA Division I FBS football season. Led by seventh-year head coach Bill Cubit, compiling an overall record of 7–6 with mark of 5–3 in conference play, placing third in the MAC West Division. Western Michigan was invited to the Little Caesars Pizza Bowl, where the Broncos lost to Purdue, 37–32. The team played home games at Waldo Stadium in Kalamazoo, Michigan.

Schedule

The Michigan game on September 3 was called after the 3rd quarter due to a lightning storm. By rule, both teams have to agree to end the game, which both teams did and Michigan was awarded the win.

Awards

MAC Player of the Week

Offensive
 Jordan White, senior, wide receiver (five awards)
 Week three: 13 receptions, 177 yards, two touchdowns, 64-yard punt return, 241 all-purpose yards
 Week four: 14 receptions, 134 yards, one touchdown
 Week six: 12 receptions, 156 yards
 Week nine: Nine receptions, 172 yards, two touchdowns
 Week 11: 16 receptions, 238 yards, three touchdowns
 Alex Carder, junior, quarterback (two awards)
 Week five: 37 completions, 51 attempts, 479 yards passing (ninth most in MAC history), five touchdowns, zero interceptions
 Week 11: 548 yards (second-most in conference history), seven passing touchdowns (tied for most in conference history), one rushing touchdown

Defensive
 Johnnie Simon, sophomore, safety
 Week nine: 10 tackles, pass break up, two quarterback hurries, interception
 Drew Nowak, senior, defensive line
 Week twelve: 5 tackles, 2.5 sacks, 2.5 TFL, one fumble recovery

Special teams
 John Potter, senior, placekicker (three awards)
 Week two: Five for five point after touchdowns, 40-yard field goal
 Week three: Five for five point after touchdowns, three field goals, four touchbacks
 Week 11: Nine for nine point after touchdowns, MAC's record holder for consecutive PATs made in a career

References

External links

Western Michigan
Western Michigan Broncos football seasons
Western Michigan Broncos football